Defending champion Kevin Krawietz and his partner Andreas Mies defeated Rafael Matos and David Vega Hernández in the final, 4–6, 6–4, [10–7] to win the doubles tennis title at the 2022 Bavarian International Tennis Championships.

Krawietz and Wesley Koolhof and were the reigning champions, but Koolhof chose not to participate.

Seeds

Draw

Draw

References

External links
 Main draw

BMW Open - Doubles
Doubles